Solomon Joseph Hemus (April 17, 1923 – October 2, 2017) was an American  professional baseball infielder, manager, and coach, who played in Major League Baseball (MLB) for the St. Louis Cardinals and Philadelphia Phillies. Hemus is one of a select group of big league players to have held a dual role as a player-manager.

Hemus was born in Phoenix, Arizona, and raised in San Diego, where he graduated from Saint Augustine High School. He served in the United States Navy during World War II, and began his professional playing career in the Cardinals' farm system as a 23-year-old in 1946.

Baseball career

Player
During his 11-year MLB playing career (–), Hemus was primarily a shortstop (472 games and 3,745 innings played), although he also saw significant time as a second baseman (211 games, 1,635 innings). Hemus compiled a lifetime batting average of .273 in 961 games and collected 736 hits, with 137 doubles, 41 triples, 51 home runs and 263 RBI. He led National League batters in being hit by pitched balls three times.

Manager and coach
When he was traded to the Phillies in May , Hemus wrote a letter to Cardinals owner Gussie Busch, expressing his pride in being a Cardinal and his gratitude to the baseball club. Nearing the end of his playing career, he was reacquired by the Cardinals on September 29, 1958 — one day after the regular season ended — and named St. Louis' player-manager by Busch, who admired Hemus' fiery personality and remembered his letter from  years before. Hemus took over the Cardinals in time to lead them on an October 1958 "good will" tour of Hawaii and Japan.

His Cardinals were inconsistent. Hemus' first club lost 15 of its first 20 games and stumbled to a seventh place (71–83) finish in 1959. That was followed by a 15-game improvement (86–68) and a leap to third place in his second season. His career managing record was 190–192 (.497). He was thrown out of 11 of the 382 games he managed, comprising over one-third of his career MLB ejections.

Hemus then served as a coach with the New York Mets (1962–1963) and Cleveland Indians (1964–1965). He was on manager Casey Stengel's coaching staff when the 1962 Mets expansion team ended up with a record of 40–120, still the most losses by a Major League team in a single season since the nineteenth century.

During his tenure in Philadelphia, Hemus made history when he was removed for pinch runner John Kennedy at Roosevelt Stadium in Jersey City, New Jersey, during a league game against the Brooklyn Dodgers on April 22, 1957. It marked the Major League debut of Kennedy, the first African-American player in the Phillies' history. In 2011, Hall-of-Famer Bob Gibson indicated that racial prejudice on Hemus' part had intruded on his later role as the Cards' manager when Hemus disparaged both Gibson and teammate Curt Flood by telling them they were not good enough to make it as Major Leaguers and should try something else.  Hemus' replacement, Keane, was a Gibson supporter who had managed the pitcher in the minor leagues.

Death
Hemus died at 94 following  a long illness in Houston, on October 3, 2017.

See also
 List of Major League Baseball annual runs scored leaders
List of Major League Baseball player-managers

References

External links

1923 births
2017 deaths
American people of Austrian descent
Baseball players from Phoenix, Arizona
Cleveland Indians coaches
Columbus Red Birds players
Houston Buffaloes players
Major League Baseball first base coaches
Major League Baseball infielders
Major League Baseball player-managers
Major League Baseball third base coaches
New York Mets coaches
Philadelphia Phillies players
Pocatello Cardinals players
St. Louis Cardinals managers
St. Louis Cardinals players
United States Navy personnel of World War II